Diplaziopsis is a genus of ferns in the family Diplaziopsidaceae. The genus name means 'like Diplazium'.

Species
, the Checklist of Ferns and Lycophytes of the World and Plants of the World Online accepted three species:
Diplaziopsis cavaleriana (Christ) C.Chr.
Diplaziopsis flavoviridis (Alston) Christenh.
Diplaziopsis javanica (Blume) C.Chr.

References

Polypodiales
Fern genera